Hyland Hills Ski Area is a ski area in Bloomington, Minnesota, United States, just south of Minneapolis.  It is owned and operated by Three Rivers Park District. As a popular destination located near the Mall of America, Hyland receives 160,000 visitors per year. While Minnesota's winters are cold, the average snowfall is low for a ski area (less than 60 in.), due to this, there is often use of Artificial snow to help maintain the viability of the slopes.

In 2016 the chalet underwent a $13.3 million renovation that more than doubled the size of the previous. The new chalet is 36,000 square feet, and includes a gear shop, rentals, and a restaurant. The chalet is also open to hosting private events. Their rope tow is considered by many to be world-class.

History
In the 1950s, the Hyland Hills Ski Area was known as Mt. Normandale, with an annual attendance of around 48,000 skiers. After a snow drought of 6 years, the number of skiers dropped significantly. This caused Normandale to purchase a snowmaker and a sitzlift in an attempt to bring more skiers into the area. The owners, Gordy Bowen, and Oscar Strand found that this did little to help their business as the man-made snow settled into a hard mass and they did not have the grooming tools necessary to maintain the artificial snow.

Soon after Bowen and Strand's efforts, the Hennepin County Park Reserve District bought the area and renamed it to Hyland Hills Ski Area. With the addition of sophisticated grooming equipment, a new set of buildings, and proper chairlifts, the Hyland Hills Ski Area regained its former popularity.

Ski Clubs
Hyland is home to many different ski and snowboard clubs for a variety of ages and skill levels. Among these is Three Rivers Racing, an Alpine Skiing club for youth aged 6–21 that provides premier coaching for aspiring skiers and has trained racers who end up competing in national, World Cup, and Olympic level races. Hyland also hosts both USSA freestyle skiing and racing teams and the G Team, one of the leading snowboard clubs in the midwest. The Minneapolis Ski Club also offers Nordic Ski Jumping training at the ski jump at Hyland.

Winter activities

 Alpine skiing
 Night skiing
 Snowboarding
 Nordic skiing
 Snowshoeing
 Ski jumping

Summer activities
The park is open in the off-season for a variety of activities that include,
 Auto Shows
 Outdoor cinema
 Live music
 Chairlift rides
 Hiking
 Happy hour

References

External links
Hyland Hills Ski Area Homepage

Buildings and structures in Bloomington, Minnesota
Ski areas and resorts in Minnesota
Tourist attractions in Hennepin County, Minnesota